The 1967 Speedway World Team Cup was the eighth edition of the FIM Speedway World Team Cup to determine the team world champions.

The final took place in Malmö, Sweden. The title was won by Sweden for the fifth time from defending champions Poland. Great Britain and the Soviet Union drew for third place on 19 points each

Results

World final
 September 1
  Malmö Stadion

* Great Britain and Soviet Union equal 3rd place

See also
 1967 Individual Speedway World Championship

References

Speedway World Team Cup
1967 in speedway